Ourlal District is a district of Biskra Province, Algeria.

Municipalities
The district has 5 municipalities:
Ourlala
Oumache
M'Lili
Mekhadma
Lioua

References

Districts of Biskra Province